William de Gruchy (born 10 May 1930) is an Australian former athlete who specialised in sprinting.

Biography
A Western Australian athlete, de Gruchy was raised in the Perth suburb of Mount Hawthorn.

De Gruchy studied at both St Patrick's Boys' School and Aquinas College in Perth.

In 1950, de Gruchy represented Australia at the British Empire Games in Auckland, where he won a silver medal in the 100 yard sprint and was a member of the gold medal-winning  team.

De Gruchy won the national 100 yard sprint title for the only time in 1951, edging three-time champion John Treloar. He was overlooked in favour of John Treloar for the 1952 Helsinki Olympics. 

At the 1952 WA state championships, de Gruchy ran the 100 yard sprint in a wind assisted 9.6 seconds.

References

External links
William de Gruchy Results at Commonwealth Games Australia

See also
List of Commonwealth Games medallists in athletics (men)

1930 births
Living people
Australian male sprinters
Athletes from Perth, Western Australia
Commonwealth Games gold medallists for Australia
Commonwealth Games silver medallists for Australia
Commonwealth Games medallists in athletics
Medallists at the 1950 British Empire Games
Athletes (track and field) at the 1950 British Empire Games
People educated at Aquinas College, Perth